Boukoumbé or Boukombé is a town, arrondissement and commune in north western Benin on the border with Togo.  It is known for its market, its whipping ceremony and for its tradition of pipe making. Mount Kousso-Kovangou, the highest point in Benin, lies nearby.

The commune covers an area of 1036 square kilometres and as of 2002 had a population of 60,568 people.

Geography
The town of Boukoumbé is located 582 kilometres from Cotonou and lies on the border with Togo in the west of the country. Communally it is bounded to the north by Cobly and Tanguiéta, south by Copargo, west by Togo and east by Toucountouna, Kouandé and Natitingou.

Administrative divisions
Boukoumbé is subdivided into 7 arrondissements; Boukoumbè, Dipoli, Korontière, Kossoucoingou, Manta, Natta and Tabota. They contain 55 villages and 16 urban districts.

Economy
Most of the population are engaged in agricultural activities followed by trade, transportation and handicrafts. The main crops grown are maize, cotton, cowpeas, peanuts, okra, cassava and tomatoes.

References

External links
 Boukoumbé, Benin
 Health projects in Boukombé, Benin

Communes of Benin
Benin–Togo border crossings
Populated places in the Atakora Department
Arrondissements of Benin